The Catholic Nunciature to Antigua and Barbuda is the diplomatic mission of the Holy See to the Antigua and Barbuda and is an ecclesiastical office of the Catholic Church with the rank of an embassy. 

Pope John Paul II established the Nunciature to Antigua and Barbuda on 15 December 1986.

Papal representatives to Antigua and Barbuda
Manuel Monteiro de Castro (25 April 1987 - 21 August 1990)
Eugenio Sbarbaro (7 February 1991 - 26 April 2000)
Emil Paul Tscherrig (20 January 2001 - 22 May 2004)
Thomas Edward Gullickson (15 December 2004 - 21 May 2011)
Nicola Girasoli (29 October 2011 - 16 June 2007)
Fortunatus Nwachukwu (4 November 2017 – 17 December 2021)
Santiago de Wit Guzmán (30 July 2022    – present)

See also
Apostolic Delegation to the Antilles

References

Apostolic Nuncios to Antigua and Barbuda
Antigua
Catholic Church in Antigua and Barbuda
1987 establishments in Antigua and Barbuda
Holy See
Antigua and Barbuda–Holy See relations

it:Chiesa cattolica in Antigua e Barbuda#Nunziatura apostolica